Lynda Lemay (born 25 July 1966 in Portneuf, Quebec) is a Canadian francophone singer-songwriter. Through her mother she is a descendant of Zacharie Cloutier.

After winning regional awards in 1989 she went to France and regularly tours in Quebec and France, including at the Paris Olympia.

Her recording "Live" was nominated as one of the best-selling Francophone albums at the 2000 Juno Awards.

Discography

Albums

Compilation albums

Awards and recognition
 1995: 4 Félix Award nominations: Female Artist of the Year, Pop Album of the Year (Y), Songwriter of the Year, Concert of the Year
 1996: Félix Award nomination: Artist with best recognition outside Quebec
 1998: Félix Award winner, Female Artist of the Year; 4 other Félix nominations: Pop Album of the Year  (Lynda Lemay), Best Selling Album of the Year (ibid.), Concert of the Year, Artist with best recognition outside Quebec
 1999: 2 Félix Award nominations: Pop Album of the Year (Lynda Lemay live), Artist with best recognition outside Quebec
 2000: Félix Award winner, Artist with best recognition outside Quebec
 2001: 4 Félix Award nominations: Female Artist of the Year, Pop Album of the Year (Du coq à l'âme), Concert of the Year, Quebec Artist with most recognition outside Quebec
 2002: 3 Félix Award nominations: Female Artist of the Year, Pop Album of the Year (Les lettres rouges), Quebec Artist with best recognition outside Quebec
 2004: Félix Award nomination: Quebec Artist with best recognition outside Quebec

References

External links 

  Lynda Lemay's official site
  Site allemand dédié aux fans de Lynda Lemay – German Fansite
  Lynda Lemay fan club
  Tout l'univers de Lynda Lemay
  Lynda Lemay at Quebec Info Musique

1966 births
Canadian women singers
Canadian singer-songwriters
French Quebecers
French-language singers of Canada
Living people
Songwriters from Quebec
Singers from Quebec
People from Capitale-Nationale